Mavroi Aetoi Eleftherochori F.C. is a Greek football club, based in Eleftherochori, Trikala.

Honors

Domestic Titles and honors
 Eps Trikala Champions: 1
 2015-16

Trikala (regional unit)
Association football clubs established in 1977
1977 establishments in Greece
Gamma Ethniki clubs